Humphrey Morrey, or Murrey (–1716) was the first mayor of Philadelphia under William Penn's 1691 charter. He was not elected, but rather was appointed by Penn. He was ancestor of the singer, actor, and political activist Paul Robeson.

Political career
Morrey was one of the 15 founders of Cheltenham Township, Pennsylvania.

Morrey first came to Philadelphia in 1683 and worked as a merchant. In 1685, he was appointed a justice of the peace. In 1687, and again in 1690, he was chosen to the provincial assembly. In the charter of March 20, 1691, by which Philadelphia was incorporated as a city, Morrey was appointed mayor. The length of his term was 10 years. In 1701, he was succeeded by Edward Shippen, who was appointed by Penn to a one-year term, then re-elected to a second term by the City Council.

See also
 Philadelphia history and timeline

References

1650 births
1716 deaths
Mayors of Philadelphia
People from Cheltenham, Pennsylvania
People of colonial Pennsylvania
Colonial American merchants